The 2007 World Wrestling Entertainment (WWE) draft, the fifth WWE draft, took place at the Wachovia Arena in Wilkes-Barre, Pennsylvania on June 11. The first half of the draft was televised live for three hours on World Wrestling Entertainment's  program, Raw on USA Network.  The second half of the draft, or the "supplemental draft", was conducted over WWE's website, WWE.com, for four hours on June 17, 2007, as draft picks were announced at twenty-minute intervals. There were twenty-three draft picks, with twenty-seven wrestlers drafted overall, between the promotion's three brands: Raw, SmackDown!, and ECW. For the televised half of the draft, each brand's draft pick was determined by nine matches, one being a battle royal for two draft picks, where wrestlers from their respective brands wrestled to earn a draft pick. The supplemental draft, however, was conducted randomly, with each brand receiving random draft selections. Raw and SmackDown! received five random draft picks, while ECW received three random draft picks. The televised draft picks were randomly selected by a computer that was shown on the Raw titantron. Every WWE wrestler from Raw, SmackDown!, and ECW was eligible to be drafted.

Background
The draft was announced by Shane McMahon on the May 28, 2007 episode of Raw from the Air Canada Centre in Toronto, Ontario, and was promoted as the "first ever tri-branded draft". Besides the promoted draft, the show was billed as "Mr. McMahon Appreciation Night", a tribute of appreciation to the WWE Chairman, Vince McMahon, who was blown up in his limousine later that night.

The draft lottery is a concept used by WWE to improve its weekly television ratings of Raw, SmackDown! and ECW. The WWE yet again used the concept in 2007, to improve its television ratings. The 2007 WWE draft was the first official draft lottery to take place in WWE since the 2005 WWE draft lottery.

Wrestler selections

Televised draft

Matches
During the program, representatives from the Raw, ECW, and SmackDown brands were involved in matches that determined which brand received a draft pick. Overall, there were 9 matches, Both SmackDown! and Raw got four while ECW got two.

Selections

Supplemental draft

 1 – The referee reversed his decision to give The Miz the win due to Snitsky ignoring the referee whilst attacking Miz.
 2 – This person was drafted alongside the drafted wrestler.
 3 – Bobby Lashley was stripped of the ECW World Championship after being drafted to Raw, vacating the title as a result.
 4 – Both members of the tag team were drafted in unison.
 5 – Viscera would debut on the July 10 episode of ECW repackaged as Big Daddy V.
 6 – Hardcore Holly made his re-debut on Raw rather than SmackDown!.
 7 – Weeks after his ECW debut, Johnny Nitro would repackage himself as John Morrison'''.
 8 - Other match participants: Raw; Johnny Nitro, Eugene, Kenny Dykstra, and Viscera. SmackDown!; Chris Masters, Mark Henry, Chavo Guerrero, and William Regal. ECW; Tommy Dreamer, The Sandman, Marcus Cor Von, Kevin Thorn, and Matt Striker.

Aftermath
The 2007 draft lottery provided WWE's three brands with new wrestlers, allowing for new storylines and rivalries. Television ratings for WWE increased, as Raw, SmackDown!, and ECW'' became the most watched programs on their respective television networks in the summer of 2007. Four months after the draft, on October 16, 2007, it was announced that ECW and SmackDown! would have a talent exchange that would allow wrestlers from their respective brands to compete on either brand. At the end of the show Vince McMahon's limousine blew up which appeared to be the demise of the evil WWE owner. Two weeks later Vince McMahon appeared on WWE Monday Night Raw breaking kayfabe and explained that his demise was all a part of a storyline. The reason for this was that Chris Benoit was found dead in his home along with his wife and son. At the time, details of his death were not certain so WWE dedicated the show to Chris Benoit and his family.

References

External links
WWE Draft 2007 results at WWE.com
WWE Supplemental Draft 2007 results at WWE.com

Wwe Draft, 2007
ECW (WWE brand)
WWE draft
Professional wrestling in Pennsylvania
Events in Pennsylvania
June 2007 events in the United States
2007 in Pennsylvania